22-year old Helena Andersson disappeared on 14 June 1992 in Mariestad, Sweden. Since then several different suspects in her disappearance have been arrested, and later released without charge. The disappearance has received extensive media attention since 1992.

Disappearance
She had been at a friend’s housewarming party in Töreboda, later in the evening she and a few friends decided to continue partying at the Stadshotellet nightclub in central Mariestad. At 2 in the morning she headed home by foot, an hour later several witnesses heard a woman screaming. About  from her parents' home, Andersson's rings and sandals were found. Also found were drips of blood. She has not been heard from since. The first man to be a suspect was a Danish man who witnesses had seen driving a white car, allegedly picking up Helena Andersson and driving away from the Stadshotellet. He was arrested and later released.

Investigation and arrests
In August 2019, DNA tests found traces of three different people on her sandals. In August 2021, a man in his 60s was arrested in connection with Helena Andersson's disappearance.

He was later released but remains a suspect in her disappearance. In 2020, the Swedish police special cold case group in Gothenburg started investigating the case. During the evening Helena called her sister to ask her if she had seen her wallet, her sister told her she would pay for a taxi home. Helena decided to walk home anyway.

Two rings she had been wearing and sandals were found the day after her disappearance. Several witnesses told police they saw a white or possibly light coloured car near the place were Helena Andersson's belongings were found. The 60 year old suspect had a white car at the time of Helena Andersson's disappearance, since then the car had been scrapped this was revealed in 2021. Witnesses heard a loud scream identified by them as that of a woman screaming.

In 2017, another man was arrested in suspicion of the disappearance but he was also released later. He was known in media as "the man with pilot-glasses".

In 2010, a white Volvo 744 was examined for evidence by investigators. It formerly belonged to a 80-year-old man who had died in a house fire, because of tips from the public. It was deemed to not have anything to do with her disappearance. In September 2021, investigators revealed that the 60 year old suspects DNA had been sent for analysis at the National Forensic Centre. It will be matched to the blood traces found on her sandals. After his arrest police also search his home, and the area where she disappeared, without revealing any results to media.

Her disappearance has also been linked to murderer Anders Eklund, but no charges have been brought.

On 20 June 2022, Swedish prosecutors handling the case decided to close all investigations and work on the case. It will only be re-opened if new evidence emerges.

In media
The disappearance has been extensively mentioned in Swedish media, and Efterlyst, Veckans Brott, and Sveriges Radio has produced documentaries about the case.

In April 2021, Danish author Lotte Dalgaard published the book  (Nightmare in Mariestad — Story of Helena Andersson's disappearance).

Criminologist Leif GW Persson states that he is certain he knows who kidnapped and murdered Helena Andersson, and has claimed to have spent over 1000 hours investigating the case.

See also
 List of people who disappeared

References

1990s missing person cases
1992 in Sweden
June 1992 events in Europe
Missing person cases in Sweden
Västra Götaland County